Martin Jiranek (born October 3, 1969) is a Canadian former professional ice hockey player. He is currently an assistant coach for the Fischtown Pinguins.

Career 
Jiranek played in the American Hockey League for the Baltimore Skipjacks and Portland Pirates before moving to Europe. He played in the Austrian Hockey League for Kapfenberger SV and in Serie A for HC Gherdëina before spending 11 seasons in the Deutsche Eishockey Liga playing for the Nürnberg Ice Tigers and ERC Ingolstadt.

After retiring, Jiranek was briefly head coach of the Krefeld Pinguine and was the sports manager of the Thomas Sabo Ice Tigers for six seasons.

Career statistics

Awards and honours

References

External links

1969 births
Living people
Baltimore Skipjacks players
Bowling Green Falcons men's ice hockey players
Calgary Canucks players
Canadian expatriate ice hockey players in Austria
Canadian ice hockey centres
Canadian ice hockey coaches
Ice hockey people from Alberta
ERC Ingolstadt players
EC Kapfenberg players
National Hockey League supplemental draft picks
Nürnberg Ice Tigers players
People from Camrose County
Portland Pirates players
HC Gardena players
Washington Capitals draft picks
Canadian expatriate ice hockey players in Italy
Canadian expatriate ice hockey players in Germany
Canadian expatriate ice hockey players in the United States